The European Pollutant Release and Transfer Register (E-PRTR) is a Pollutant Release and Transfer Register providing access to information on the annual emissions of industrial facilities in the Member States of the European Union (EU), as well as Norway.

EPER collects data about the emissions of 12,000 facilities in the 25 EU Member States. Data are available by country, by pollutant, by activity (sector), air and water (direct or via a sewerage system).

References

External links
 European Pollutant Release and Transfer Register (E-PRTR) 
 European Pollutant Emission Register
 EPER in Google Earth
 Centre for PRTR Data (OECD)
 Resource Centre for PRTR Release Estimation Techniques (OECD)
 PRTR Virtual Classroom (UNITAR)
 PRTR Capacity Building Library (UNITAR)

Pollutant release inventories and registers
European Union and the environment
Government databases of the European Union